Bruma may refer to:

People
Bruma (footballer) (born 1994), Portuguese football winger
Jeffrey Bruma (born 1991), Dutch football defender, brother of Marciano
Marciano Bruma (born 1984), Dutch football defender, brother of Jeffrey
Eddy Bruma (1925–2000), Surinamese politician, lawyer and writer

Other uses
Bruma, the Latin name for the day of the winter solstice, which ended the Brumalia festival
Bruma (moth), a genus of moths in the family Erebidae
Bruma, Gauteng, a suburb of Johannesburg, South Africa
Bruma, a fictional city within The Elder Scrolls universe
Bruma (or BrUMa, short for BRonx Upper MAnhattan), an area of parallel uptown neighborhoods of New York City combining the Bronx and Upper Manhattan

See also
Burma (disambiguation)